Jerzy Janowicz was the defending champion but chose not to defend his title.

Matteo Berrettini won the title after defeating Stefano Napolitano 6–2, 3–6, 6–2 in the final.

Seeds

Draw

Finals

Top half

Bottom half

References
Main Draw
Qualifying Draw

Trofeo Faip-Perrel - Singles
2018 Singles